The Innovator's Dilemma: When New Technologies Cause Great Firms to Fail, first published in 1997, is the best-known work of the Harvard professor and businessman Clayton Christensen. It expands on the concept of disruptive technologies, a term he coined in a 1995 article "Disruptive Technologies: Catching the Wave". It describes how large incumbent companies lose market share by listening to their customers and providing what appears to be the highest-value products, but new companies that serve low-value customers with poorly developed technology can improve that technology incrementally until it is good enough to quickly take market share from established business. Christensen recommends that large companies maintain small, nimble divisions that attempt to replicate this phenomenon internally to avoid being blindsided and overtaken by startup competitors.

Subject matter
Clayton Christensen demonstrates how successful, outstanding companies can do everything "right" and still lose their market leadership – or even fail – as new, unexpected competitors rise and take over the market.  There are two key parts to this dilemma.

 Value to innovation is an S-curve: Improving a product takes time and many iterations. The first of these iterations provide minimal value to the customer but in time the base is created and the value increases exponentially. Once the base is created then each iteration is dramatically better than the last. At some point the most valuable improvements are complete and the value per iteration is minimal again. So in the middle is the most value, at the beginning and end the value is minimal.
 Incumbent sized deals: The incumbent has the luxury of a huge customer set but high expectations of yearly sales. New entry next generation products find niches away from the incumbent customer set to build the new product. The new entry companies do not require the yearly sales of the incumbent and thus have more time to focus and innovate on this smaller venture.

For this reason, the next generation product is not being built for the incumbent's customer set and this large customer set is not interested in the new innovation and keeps demanding more innovation with the incumbent product. Unfortunately this incumbent innovation is limited to the overall value of the product as it is at the later end of the S-curve. Meanwhile, the new entrant is deep into the S-curve and providing significant value to the new product. By the time the new product becomes interesting to the incumbent's customers it is too late for the incumbent to react to the new product. At this point it is too late for the incumbent to keep up with the new entrant's rate of improvement, which by then is on the near-vertical portion of its S-curve trajectory.

Through this compelling multi-industry study, Christensen introduces his seminal theory of "disruptive innovation" that has changed the way managers and CEOs around the world think about innovation.

Christensen then argues that the following are common principles that incumbents must address:
 Resource dependence: Current customers drive a company's use of resources 
 Small markets struggle to impact an incumbent's large market 
 Disruptive technologies have fluid futures, as in, it is impossible to know what they will disrupt once matured 
 Incumbent organizations' value is more than simply their workers, it includes their processes and core capabilities which drive their efforts 
 Technology supply may not equal market demand. The attributes that make disruptive technologies unattractive in established markets are often the ones that have the greatest value in emerging markets

He also argues the following strategies assist incumbents in succeeding against the disruptive technology:
 They develop the disruptive technology with the "right" customers. Not necessarily their current customer set 
 They place the disruptive technology into an autonomous organization that can be rewarded with small wins and small customer sets
 They fail early and often to find the correct disruptive technology
 They allow the disruption organization to utilize all of the company's resources when needed but are careful to make sure the processes and values were not those of the company

Reception
Shortly after the release of the book, it received the Global Business Book Award as the best business book of the year (1997). The Economist also named it as one of the six most important books about business ever written".

Impact on business world
The term disruptive technologies was first described in depth with this book by Christensen; but the term was later changed to disruptive innovation in a later book (The Innovator's Solution). A disruptive innovation is an innovation that creates a new market and value network that will eventually disrupt an already existing market and replace an existing product.

Recent work

Since the book was published, various articles have been written, both critiquing and supporting Clayton Christensen's work.

The Innovator's Dilemma proved popular; not only was it reprinted, 
but a follow-up book entitled The Innovator's Solution was published. 
His books Disrupting Class about education
and The Innovator's Prescription about health care both utilize ideas from The Innovator's Dilemma.

References

Further reading 
 Jill Lepore, "What the Theory of 'Disruptive Innovation' Gets Wrong", The New Yorker, June 23, 2014.

External links
ClaytonChristensen.com website 
HarvardBusinessSchool.com website

1997 non-fiction books
Management books
Innovation
Works about the information economy